Endion School is a former school building in the East End/Endion neighborhood of Duluth, Minnesota, United States.  Built in ornate Richardsonian Romanesque style with a unique design on a prominent hilltop site, it has been a local landmark since its construction in 1890.  Endion School was listed on the National Register of Historic Places in 1983 for its local significance in the theme of architecture.  It was nominated as the finest surviving example of Duluth's Late Victorian school buildings.

The footprint of Endion School is two squares overlapping at one corner.  This unique design by local architect Adolph F. Rudolph allowed for classrooms with windows on two sides radiating around a central staircase.

A two-story annex was added to the rear of the building in 1950.  It was placed at a slight distance with a connecting hallway so all four of the original wing's ornate façades would remain visible.  Endion School closed in the 1970s.  It has since reopened as an apartment building.

See also
 National Register of Historic Places listings in St. Louis County, Minnesota

References

1890 establishments in Minnesota
Buildings and structures in Duluth, Minnesota
Defunct schools in Minnesota
Former school buildings in the United States
National Register of Historic Places in St. Louis County, Minnesota
Richardsonian Romanesque architecture in Minnesota
School buildings completed in 1890
School buildings on the National Register of Historic Places in Minnesota
Schools in St. Louis County, Minnesota